XImage is the X client side storage mechanism for an X Window System pixel map. The structure of an XImage as defined by the X Window core protocol is the following:

 typedef struct XImage XImage;
 struct XImage {
   int width, height;		/* size of image */
   int xoffset;			/* number of pixels offset in X direction */
   int format;			/* XYBitmap, XYPixmap, ZPixmap */
   char *data;			/* pointer to image data */
   int byte_order;		/* data byte order, LSBFirst, MSBFirst */
   int bitmap_unit;		/* quant. of scanline 8, 16, 32 */
   int bitmap_bit_order;		/* LSBFirst, MSBFirst */
   int bitmap_pad;		/* 8, 16, 32 either XY or ZPixmap */
   int depth;			/* depth of image */
   int bytes_per_line;		/* accelerator to next scanline */
   int bits_per_pixel;		/* bits per pixel (ZPixmap) */
   unsigned long red_mask;	/* bits in z arrangement */
   unsigned long green_mask;
   unsigned long blue_mask;
   XPointer obdata;		/* hook for the object routines to hang on */
   struct funcs {		/* image manipulation routines */
     XImage *(*create_image)();
     int (*destroy_image)();
     unsigned long (*get_pixel)();
     int (*put_pixel)();
     XImage *(*sub_image)();
     int (*add_pixel)();
   } f;
 };

X Window System